
Havergal may refer to:

People

Given name
Havergal Brian (1876–1972), British classical composer

Surname
Beatrix Havergal (1901–1980), English horticulturist
Frances Ridley Havergal (1836–1879), English religious poet and hymnwriter
Francis Tebbs Havergal (1829–1890), English author and editor
Giles Havergal (born 1938), Scottish theatre director and actor
Henry East Havergal (1820–1875) English clergyman and organist
William Henry Havergal (1793–1870), English clergyman, writer, composer and hymnwriter

Schools
Havergal College, school for girls Toronto, Canada